OG, O.G., or Og may refer to:

Arts and entertainment

Characters
Og, in Time Bandits
Og, in Mike, Lu & Og
Og, the leprechaun in the stage musical Finian's Rainbow and the subsequent film adaptation
Ogden "Og" Morrow, in Ready Player One
Original Girls, in the TV series Teen Mom OG

Music
 "O.G.", a song by Snoop Dogg from Death Row: The Lost Sessions Vol. 1
Omnium Gatherum, or OG, a Finnish band

Other uses in arts and entertainment
O.G. (film), a 2018 film
Og, the setting of the novel The Secret World of Og and its associated film

People
Og, an ancient Amorite king of Bashan
OG Anunoby (born 1997), British basketball player
Ogom Chijindu, Nigerian sportswoman known as "OG"

Science and technology
Oganesson, symbol Og, a chemical element
Obstetrics and gynaecology
Orange G, a synthetic dye
Original gravity, used in calculating the alcohol content of a drink
og, a namespace identifier typically tied in web pages to the Facebook Open Graph protocol

Sports 
OG (esports), a professional Dota 2 team
Offensive guard, a player position in American and Canadian football
Own goal, a term used in association football

Other uses
Original Gangsters (gang), a Swedish gang
River Og, Wiltshire, England
One-Two-GO Airlines (IATA airline code: OG)

See also 

Original (disambiguation)
0G (disambiguation)
Zero-G (disambiguation)